The Definitive Simon and Garfunkel is the fourth compilation album of greatest hits by the folk duo Simon & Garfunkel, released in UK & Europe in 1991.

To promote the album, “A Hazy Shade of Winter” and “The Boxer” were re-released as singles in the UK in 1991 and 1992 respectively.

Track listing
All songs written and composed by Paul Simon, except where noted
"Wednesday Morning, 3 A.M."
"The Sound of Silence"
"Homeward Bound"
"Kathy's Song" (Live)
"I Am a Rock"
"For Emily, Whenever I May Find Her" (Live)
"Scarborough Fair/Canticle" (Traditional, arranged by Paul Simon, Art Garfunkel) 
"The 59th Street Bridge Song (Feelin' Groovy)"
"Seven O'Clock News/Silent Night"
"A Hazy Shade of Winter"
"El Condor Pasa (If I Could)" (Daniel Alomía Robles; English lyrics by Paul Simon, arranged by Jorge Milchberg)
"Mrs. Robinson"
"America"
"At the Zoo"
"Old Friends"
"Bookends Theme"
"Cecilia"
"The Boxer"
"Bridge over Troubled Water"
"Song for the Asking"

Tracks 1,2 Produced by Tom Wilson
Tracks 3,5,7-10, Produced by Bob Johnston
Track 14 Produced by Bob Johnston, Paul Simon, Art Garfunkel
Tracks 4,6, 11–13, 15-20 Produced by Paul Simon, Art Garfunkel & Roy Halee
Compiled by Art Garfunkel

Charts

Weekly charts

Year-end charts

Certifications

References

1994 greatest hits albums
Simon & Garfunkel compilation albums
Albums produced by Bob Johnston
Albums produced by Roy Halee
Albums produced by Tom Wilson (record producer)
Columbia Records compilation albums
Albums produced by Paul Simon
Albums produced by Art Garfunkel